South Carolina Highway 527 (SC 527) is a  state highway in the U.S. state of South Carolina. The highway travels in a southeast–northwest direction.

Route description
SC 527 begins on the Williamsburg–Georgetown county line north of Andrews at SC 41. It travels northwest to Williamsburg County's seat, Kingstree where it has a brief concurrency with U.S. Route 52 (US 52). Continuing northwest into Clarendon County, it intersects US 301 and Interstate 95 (I-95) but does not pass through any incorporated municipalities in this county. It then cuts through the eastern panhandle of Sumter County, again not passing through any incorporated towns. It does intersect US 378 at the approximate midpoint through this county. SC 527 as it enters Lee County heads in a more northerly course where it intersects U.S. Routes 76 and 401.

Major intersections

Kingstree connector route

South Carolina Highway 527 Connector (SC 527 Conn.) is a  connector route of SC 527. Its entire length is unsigned. It utilizes a brief segment of Thurgood Marshall Highway in Kingstree from the SC 527 mainline to SC 377.

See also

References

External links

SC 527 at Virginia Highways' South Carolina Highways Annex

527
Transportation in Williamsburg County, South Carolina
Transportation in Clarendon County, South Carolina
Transportation in Sumter County, South Carolina
Transportation in Lee County, South Carolina